The 2004 Asian Cycling Championships took place at the Yokkaichi Keirin Velodrome, Yokkaichi, Japan from 9 to 16 April 2004.

Medal summary

Road

Men

Women

Track

Men

Women

Medal table

References
 Results

External links
 Official website

Asia
Asia
Cycling
Asian Cycling Championships
International cycle races hosted by Japan